Álex Collado Gutiérrez (born 22 April 1999) is a Spanish professional footballer who plays for La Liga club Elche, on loan from Barcelona. Mainly an attacking midfielder, he can also play as a winger.

Club career

Barcelona
Born in Sabadell, Barcelona, Catalonia, Collado joined FC Barcelona's youth setup in 2009, after stints at RCD Espanyol and CE Mercantil. He was a member of the Barcelona youth team that won the 2017–18 UEFA Youth League, defeating Chelsea 3–0 in the final.

After progressing through the youth setup, Collado made his debut for Barcelona B in the Segunda División on 17 March 2018, starting in a 1–1 away draw against Lorca FC. He scored his first goal for Barça B on 15 December 2018, the last-minute winner in a 2–1 home win against Lleida Esportiu. 

Collado made his first team debut for Barcelona, as a starter, on 4 May 2019 in a 2–0 away loss to Celta Vigo in La Liga. Ahead of the 2020–21 season, Collado was named the new captain of Barça B following the long term injury of former captain Ferrán Sarsanedas.

On 31 March 2021, Collado renewed his contract with Barça for two further years, until 2023. However in August 2021 during Barcelona's pre-season, Collado left Barça's training camp in Stuttgart to resolve his future. After failed loan moves to Club Brugge and Sheffield United, Collado was left unregistered and wasn't included in either the senior squad or Barça B, which meant that he couldn't play until January 2022. It was then decided by the club that he would have to leave on loan in January due to La Liga regulations not allowing his registration for the rest of the season.

Loan to Granada
On 9 December 2021, Barça had announced that an agreement in principle was reached with Granada CF for the loan of Collado until the end of the season. The following 7 January, Granada officially announced the signing of Collado after bureaucratic issues were settled. He made his debut the next day in a 1–1 draw in the league against his parent club Barcelona.

Loan to Elche
On 15 August 2022, Collado agreed to a one-year loan deal with Elche CF also in the top tier.

Career statistics

Honours
Barcelona
La Liga: 2018–19
UEFA Youth League: 2017–18

References

External links

1999 births
Living people
Sportspeople from Sabadell
Spanish footballers
Footballers from Catalonia
Association football midfielders
La Liga players
Segunda División players
Segunda División B players
FC Barcelona Atlètic players
FC Barcelona players
Granada CF footballers
Elche CF players
Spain youth international footballers
Catalonia international footballers